Jacob William Laing Pierce (born 10 September 1997) is a New Zealand rugby union player who plays for the Brave Lupus in the Japan Rugby League One . His position of choice is lock.

Early life
Jacob Pierce is eligible to represent Japan since he spent his first 10 years living in Yamaguchi, Shizuoka and Kanagawa.

References 

New Zealand rugby union players
1997 births
Living people
Rugby union locks
Blues (Super Rugby) players
North Harbour rugby union players
Toshiba Brave Lupus Tokyo players
Rugby union players from Auckland